Réka Szemerkényi is a Hungarian economist, political scientist and politician, who was the Hungarian ambassador to the United States from 2015 to 2017. She was state secretary for foreign policy and national security advisor to the Prime Minister of Hungary Viktor Orbán from 1998 to 2002.

References 

Living people
Hungarian politicians
Hungarian economists
Ambassadors of Hungary to the United States
Hungary–United States relations
Hungarian women diplomats
Hungarian women ambassadors
Year of birth missing (living people)